Taohuayuan (meaning "Peach blossom source") is a scenic area in Taoyuan County, Hunan, China, in memory of Tao Yuanming's The Peach Blossom Spring. 

It has been a sacred Taoist site since the Tang Dynasty.

Taohuayuan was made an AAAAA-level national forest park in 2020.

See also
Tourism in Hunan Province

References

External links

 Taohuayuan Scenic Area (Changde City, Hunan)

AAAAA-rated tourist attractions
Tourist attractions in Hunan